Montezuma County is a county located in the U.S. state of Colorado. As of the 2020 census, the population was 25,849. The county seat is Cortez.

Mesa Verde National Park, Canyons of the Ancients National Monument, Yucca House National Monument, and Hovenweep National Monument preserve hundreds of ancient Amerindian structures, including the famous cliff-dwellings, found in the county.  Montezuma County is also home to most of the Ute Mountain Indian Reservation, home of the Weeminuche Band of the Ute Nation, known as the Ute Mountain Ute Tribe, with its headquarters at Towaoc.

History
Montezuma County has been settled since approximately AD 600, and had an estimated population of approximately 100,000, four times its current population, in the 12th century. However, a series of events caused virtually all permanent settlements to be abandoned between 1200 and 1300, and the area was contested between nomadic Ute and Navajo bands until resettlement occurred in the 1870s. Montezuma County was created out of the western portion of La Plata County by the Colorado Legislature in April 1889. It was named in honor of Moctezuma II, who reigned as emperor of the Aztec Empire in Mexico during its decline at the hands of the Spanish invasion. The building ruins in Mesa Verde National Park were thought to be of Aztec origin at the time.

Geography

A large county, roughly 1/3 of its area is tribal land, 1/3 is federal land (administered by the National Park Service, the United States Forest Service and the Bureau of Land Management), and 1/3 private or state/county land. The county has the second largest reservoir in Colorado, McPhee Reservoir, many other large reservoirs, and hundreds of private lakes and ponds. Much of the county is irrigated cropland, and it produces fruit, large numbers of cattle and sheep, and beans. It is served by U.S. Highways 160 and 491 (formerly US 666), and by Cortez Municipal Airport. It has no rail service, although both Mancos and Dolores were established as railroad towns in the 1890s.

Adjacent counties

Dolores County - north
San Juan County - northeast
La Plata County - east
San Juan County, New Mexico - south - New Mexico portion of Four Corners.
Apache County, Arizona - southwest - Arizona portion of Four Corners.
San Juan County, Utah - west - Utah portion of Four Corners.

Montezuma County is the only county in the United States to border three counties with the same name in three different states (San Juan County in Colorado, New Mexico, and Utah). The "border" with San Juan County, Colorado, is, however, only a point of zero length.

Major Highways
  U.S. Highway 160
  U.S. Highway 491 (former US 666)
  State Highway 41
  State Highway 145
  State Highway 184

National protected areas

Calico National Recreation Trail
Canyons of the Ancients National Monument (part)
Highline Loop National Recreation Trail
Hovenweep National Monument (part)
Lowry Ruin National Historic Landmark, now part of Canyons of the Ancients National Monument
Mesa Verde National Park
Mesa Verde Wilderness
Old Spanish National Historic Trail
Petroglyph Point National Recreation Trail
San Juan National Forest
Yucca House National Monument

State protected area
Mancos State Park

Other protected area
McPhee Reservoir

Trails and byways
Great Parks Bicycle Route
San Juan Skyway
Trail of the Ancients
Western Express Bicycle Route

Demographics

As of the census of 2000, there were 23,830 people, 9,201 households, and 6,514 families residing in the county.  The population density was 12 people per square mile (5/km2).  There were 10,497 housing units at an average density of 5 per square mile (2/km2).  The racial makeup of the county was 81.72% White, 0.14% Black or African American, 11.23% Native American, 0.20% Asian, 0.06% Pacific Islander, 4.26% from other races, and 2.38% from two or more races.  9.50% of the population were Hispanic or Latino of any race.

There were 9,201 households, out of which 33.30% had children under the age of 18 living with them, 56.40% were married couples living together, 10.60% had a female householder with no husband present, and 29.20% were non-families. 24.60% of all households were made up of individuals, and 9.30% had someone living alone who was 65 years of age or older.  The average household size was 2.54 and the average family size was 3.04.

In the county, the population was spread out, with 27.50% under the age of 18, 7.10% from 18 to 24, 26.30% from 25 to 44, 25.30% from 45 to 64, and 13.80% who were 65 years of age or older.  The median age was 38 years. For every 100 females there were 96.70 males.  For every 100 females age 18 and over, there were 92.20 males.

The median income for a household in the county was $32,083, and the median income for a family was $38,071. Males had a median income of $30,666 versus $21,181 for females. The per capita income for the county was $17,003.  About 13.10% of families and 16.40% of the population were below the poverty line, including 23.20% of those under age 18 and 14.40% of those age 65 or over.

Communities

City
Cortez

Towns
Dolores
Mancos

Census-designated places
Lewis
Towaoc

Other unincorporated places
Arriola
Pleasant View
Yellow Jacket

Politics
In its early history Montezuma County favored the Democratic Party. It was one of the few counties in the West to be won by Alton B. Parker in 1904, and along with neighboring La Plata County was one of only two Colorado counties to give a plurality to John W. Davis in the three-way 1924 election. However, since the 1940s Montezuma has been a strongly Republican county: no Democrat since 1968 has won over forty percent of the county's vote in a Presidential election. Recently (28 July 2020), the county government has openly endorsed viewpoints described as far-right by posting web links under a "News" banner on the official county web page. These links have since been removed after community members objected to partisan positions on the county website. 

In gubernatorial elections, Montezuma County is also Republican-leaning: in 2010 it was along with neighboring Dolores County one of only two counties to give a plurality to Dan Maes. The last Democratic gubernatorial nominee to win Montezuma County was Roy Romer in 1990 when he carried all but four counties statewide. The last Democratic senatorial candidate to carry Montezuma County was Ben “Nighthorse” Campbell – later to switch to the Republican Party – in 1992.

See also

Outline of Colorado
Index of Colorado-related articles
William B. Ebbert, represented Montezuma in the Colorado General Assembly in early 20th century.
National Register of Historic Places listings in Montezuma County, Colorado
East Canyon Fire

References

External links

 
Colorado counties
Colorado placenames of Native American origin
1889 establishments in Colorado
Populated places established in 1889